In Good Company is the Canadian Chamber Choir's first studio album. It was produced and released on May 18, 2010 under the artistic direction of Julia Davids. It was recorded in August 2009 in Gretna, Manitoba at Buhler Hall while in residence at the Mennonite Collegiate Institute. The album features songs by Canadian composers, including Eleanor Daley, Allan Rae, Jocelyn Morlock, Lionel Daunais, and Jeffrey Ryan. Additionally composer  Jeff Enns was commissioned to create the song At Sunset based on the poem of the same name by Pauline Johnson. The voices of the 21 person choir come from singers that live across Canada. Special guests on the recording are mezzo-soprano Christianne Rushton, pianist Joel Tranquilla and cellist Se Hee Kim.

Choristers
Soprano
Michelle Bourque (QC)
Dawn Coulter (AB)
Nicole Jordan (NS)
Catherine Lippitt (AB)
Sarah Morrison (ON)
Christina Murray (NS)

Alto
Deborah Buck (SK)
Sonja Dennis (ON)
Karla Ferguson (MB)
Sandy Jasper (MB)
Naomi Russell (MB)Tenor
Ryan Billington (NS)
Chris Bowman (NS)
Tristan Cleveland-Thompson (NS)
Bill Hamm (AB)
Simon Hardman (ON)

Bass
Jeff Enns (ON)
Cy Giacomin (NS)
Matt Pauls (ON)
Joel Tranquilla (NB)
Jereme Wall (MB)

Track listing

References

External links
 Canadian Chamber Choir Website

 Whole Note Magazine Review in Whole Note

2010 debut albums
2010 classical albums
Canadian Chamber Choir albums